Mark Feltham may refer to:

Mark Feltham (musician) (born 1955), English harmonica player 
Mark Feltham (cricketer) (born 1963), English cricketer

See also
Feltham (disambiguation)